Daniel Waugh is the name of:

Daniel Waugh (historian), American historian
Daniel W. Waugh (1842-1921), U.S. Representative from Indiana